Valik Bon (also Romanized as Valīk Bon; also known as Valīk) is a village in Banaft Rural District, Dodangeh District, Sari County, Mazandaran Province, Iran. At the 2006 census, its population was 92, in 26 families.

References 

Populated places in Sari County